Disco in Dream is the debut concert tour by Australian recording artist Kylie Minogue. Although headlined by Minogue, the tour was an ensemble show alongside fellow Stock Aitken Waterman acts Sinitta and Dead Or Alive and supported her first two studio albums, Kylie (1988) and Enjoy Yourself (1989). The tour took place in Asia, later travelling to Europe re-titled as 'The Coca-Cola Hitman Roadshow' with a different line up of PWL and Stock Aitken Waterman artists such as Big Fun and Sonia. The shows were free to "thank British fans for their support" and targeted towards fans under the age of 18.

It is likely that during the Disco in Dream tour, the relationship between Kylie and INXS lead singer Michael Hutchence began. Michael reportedly owned an apartment in Hong Kong and, following previous flirtations at industry events Michael successfully managed to seduce the singer. Kylie ended her relationship with Jason Donovan soon afterwards.

Setlist
 "The Loco-Motion"
 "Got to Be Certain"
 "Tears on My Pillow"
 "Je Ne Sais Pas Pourquoi"
 "Made in Heaven"
 "Hand on Your Heart"
 "Wouldn't Change a Thing"
 "I Should Be So Lucky"

Tour dates

On the Go – Live in Japan

On the Go: Live in Japan is a video album by Australian singer Kylie Minogue. It was released by ALFA International and Video Collection International in Japan and in the UK on VHS and Laserdisc formats on 8 April 1990, and contains mixed footage from all concerts of the Disco in Dream concert tour, plus a documentary inserted between tracks.

Track listing

Personnel
 Kylie Minogue – executive producer
 Michael Baumohl – producer, director
 Roger Yader – producer, director
 Terry Blamey – co-producer
 Venol John – choreography
 Carol Minogue – costumes

External links
 "1989 Disco in Dream (The Hitman Roadshow)"
 Kylie Minogue notable Tours-Part 2

References

Kylie Minogue concert tours
1989 concert tours